The Trakhtemyriv Monastery was a historic cossack monastery located near the settlements of Trakhtemyriv and Zarubnytsiv of modern-day Cherkasy Oblast (province). The area where the monastery was located, former village of Monastyrok, is now submerged under the Kaniv Reservoir due to the construction of the Kaniv Hydroelectric Station.

The date of the monastery's foundation is unknown. The decree of Polish King Stephen Báthory dated 1578 made the monastery a place where sick and elderly Registered Cossacks could live at. In the 1660s, a Polish szlachta army destroyed the monastery; it was not reconstructed, and its position as the cossack monastery was replaced by the Mezhyhirskyi Monastery near Vyshhorod.

Zaporozhian Host
Eastern Orthodox monasteries in Ukraine
Former religious buildings and structures in Ukraine